Genista sagittalis, called the arrow-jointed broom and winged broom, is a species of flowering plant in the genus Genista, native to central and southern Europe, Ukraine, and Anatolia. Its subspecies Genista sagittalis subsp. delphinensis, called rock broom, has gained the Royal Horticultural Society's Award of Garden Merit.

Subtaxa
The following subspecies are currently accepted:
Genista sagittalis subsp. delphinensis (Verl.) Greuter
Genista sagittalis subsp. sagittalis
Genista sagittalis subsp. undulata (Ern) Greuter

References

External links
 

sagittalis
Flora of Central Europe
Flora of Southwestern Europe
Flora of Southeastern Europe
Flora of Ukraine
Garden plants of Europe
Taxa named by Carl Linnaeus
Plants described in 1753